"Hommage à S. Pickwick Esq. P.P.M.P.C." is the 9th piece in Claude Debussy's second set of préludes. The prelude's title refers to the protagonist of Charles Dickens' The Pickwick Papers – P.P.M.P.C. stands for "Perpetual President Member of the Pickwick Club". The piece is characteristic for its eccentric shifts in expression and often melancholy or sentimental tone. It is also notable for incorporating the opening refrain from "God Save the King". A performance lasts approximately two and a half minutes.

References

Preludes by Claude Debussy
1913 compositions
Works based on The Pickwick Papers